Arnold "Dougie" Millings (30 July 1913, in Manchester – 20 September 2001, in London) was a London-based tailor known as "the Beatles' tailor".

Millings' shop was located on 63 Old Compton Street in Soho and began designing for British pop stars such as Cliff Richard, Tommy Steele, and Adam Faith in the early 1960s and made the collarless suits the Beatles wore at the height of Beatlemania in 1963 (inspired by Pierre Cardin) as well as their stage suits for the movie Help!.  Millings made more than 500 outfits for the band.

Millings had a small part as a frustrated tailor in the movie A Hard Day's Night.

Notes

References
New York Times Obituary

External links
The Times (London) Obituary.
John Lennon's suit by Millings at the Walker Art Gallery, Liverpool

English fashion designers
1913 births
2001 deaths
Businesspeople from Manchester
20th-century English businesspeople